Cuba is an unincorporated town in Springfield Township, Allen County, in the U.S. state of Indiana. Cuba Mennonite School is located here, as is the Cuba Mennonite Church.

History
Cuba was platted in 1855. It was named after the island nation of Cuba.

Geography
Cuba Road extends north from Cuba, and Thimlar Road extends to the south.

References

Unincorporated communities in Allen County, Indiana
Unincorporated communities in Indiana
Fort Wayne, IN Metropolitan Statistical Area